Nathan Bronsten (1904–1975), or Nathan Bronstein was an American-born British writer and producer. He trained as an engineer.

Select films
They Made Me a Fugitive (1947)
Master of Bankdam (1947)
Brass Monkey (1948)
Silent Dust (1949)
The Hidden Room (1949) aka Obsession
Give Us This Day (1949)
Valley of the Eagles (1951)

References

External links

1904 births
1975 deaths
American film producers
British film producers
British male writers
American emigrants to the United Kingdom